FC Z is a Swedish TV-show about 15 nerds who never have played football (soccer). Now, under management by one of Sweden's best football players through time, Glenn Hysen, FC Z have 4 months to prove to be worthy opponents against Swedish champions Djurgårdens IF.
FC Z is a spin-off of the popular Danish reality show and team FC Zulu.

Trainers
 
Glenn Hysén (trainer)
Richard Lidberg (co-trainer)

Players season 1

 Joachim Almquist (#4)
 Andreas Andersson (#18)
 Kristoffer Andersson (#32)
 Thomas Bodström (#2) (Temporary member against Djurgårdens IF)
 Joakim Dahlin (#15)
 Felix Gottvall (#6)
 Matti Haapamäki (#23)
 Anders Hjelmberg (#3)
 Per-Olof Johansson (#16)
 Tore Kullgren (#21)
 Johan Mickels (#19)
 Farhad Rouhani (#8)
 Daniel Stjernlöf (#1)
 Per Svensson (#20)
 Robin Wiksander (#11)
 Niklas Öjman (#13)

Players season 2

 Joachim Almquist (#4)
 Andreas Andersson (#18)
 Joakim Dahlin (#15)
 Felix Gottvall (#6)
 Anders Hjelmberg (#3)
 Tore Kullgren (#21)
 Henning Larsson (#14)
 Fredrik Lundebring (#2)
 Keizo Matsubara (#5)
 Johan Mickels (#19)
 Farhad Rouhani (#8)
 Daniel Stjernlöf (#1)
 Joakim "Britney" Söderberg (#10)
 Robin Wiksander (#11)
 Niklas Öjman (#13)

Trivia
In 2006 FC Z won the Swedish TV award "Kristallen" for best reality TV show.
The first season was released on DVD on September 20, 2006.
Joakim Söderberg is nicknamed "Britney" after his idol, American singer Britney Spears.
In his spare time Tore Kullgren enjoys writing for English Wikipedia.
Both Keizo Matsubara and Joakim Söderberg played with HC Z, the hockey version of FC Z, before joining the football counterpart for season 2.

External links

Swedish reality television series